Yasmin Fridman (born 1973) is an Israeli politician. She is currently a member of Knesset for Yesh Atid.

Biography
She was placed 19th on the Yesh Atid list for the 2021 elections. Although the party won only 17 seats, she entered the Knesset on 15 June 2021 as a replacement for Orna Barbivai, after the latter was appointed to the cabinet and resigned from the Knesset under the Norwegian Law.

References

External links

1973 births
Living people
21st-century Israeli women politicians
Israeli Jews
Jewish Israeli politicians
Members of the 24th Knesset (2021–2022)
Members of the 25th Knesset (2022–)
Politicians from Beersheba
Women members of the Knesset
Yesh Atid politicians